Stripped Live in the U.K. is the second concert DVD by Christina Aguilera, and documents the premiere UK performances of The Stripped Tour. The DVD does not include "Make Over" which was situated after "Can't Hold Us Down". An extended version of "What a Girl Wants" can be seen on television broadcast of the concert. The DVD premiered on WB Network at 9 PM on November 30, 2003.

Reception 
The DVD received mixed to positive reviews from music critics. UK reviewer, Peter Martin, praised the shows production, choreography and Aguilera's vocal ability, however was critical of Aguilera's tendency to oversing and the director's overall mixing. In a positive review, Mark Deming from the New York Times called the show "Spectacular".

Track listing

Bonus features 
Exclusive interview with Aguilera about her album Stripped, the tour, and her life and causes outside of music
An introduction to the supporting cast. Meet the musicians, dancers, stylists, and choreographers who help Aguilera put on her show every night
"Gilbert's Bus Tour" — a tour of Aguilera's tour bus with backup dancer Gilbert Saldivar
"One Night In Milano" — Aguilera meeting up with Donatella Versace in Milan, the fashion capital of the world
"RSVP" — Aguilera answering questions directly from her fans
"All Around The World" — backstage perspective of how the tour came to be

Charts

Certifications

Release history

References 

Christina Aguilera video albums
2004 video albums
2004 live albums
Live video albums